Bruno Giorgi (13 August 1905, Mococa – 7 September 1993, Rio de Janeiro) was a Brazilian sculptor, from a small town in the interior of São Paulo state called Mococa. His works are displayed at several national sites. Although born in Brazil he spent much of his youth in Europe as his family returned to Italy when he was six and he did not return to Brazil until 1939.

References

External links 
Bruno Giorgi (Wikipedia page in Portuguese has more information)
Works of Bruno Giorgi
Sculptures by Bruno Giorgi

Brazilian people of Italian descent
1905 births
1993 deaths
20th-century Brazilian sculptors
20th-century Brazilian male artists
People from Mococa

fr:Bruno Giorgi